Songs From an Old Town We Once Knew is a compilation album by Three Mile Pilot, released on January 13, 2000 by Cargo Music.

Track listing

Personnel 
Adapted from the Songs From an Old Town We Once Knew liner notes.

Three Mile Pilot
 Pall Jenkins – vocals, guitar
 Armistead Burwell Smith IV – bass guitar, backing vocals
 Tom Zinser – drums

Release history

References

External links 
 

2000 compilation albums
Cargo Music albums
Three Mile Pilot albums